Till Drobisch (born 2 March 1993) is a Namibian professional racing cyclist. He rode in two events at the 2014 Commonwealth Games. In February 2016 he won the Namibia National Individual Time Trial event. The following year, he won the Namibian National Road Race Championships.

Major results
2010
 1st  Junior National Road Race Championships
 1st  Junior National Time Trial Championships
2013
 1st  National Road Race Championships
 1st  National Time Trial Championships
 1st  Under–23 National Time Trial Championships
 1st  Under–23 National Road Race Championships
2014
 1st  National Time Trial Championships
 1st  Under–23 National Time Trial Championships
 2nd National Road Race Championships
 2nd Under–23 National Road Race Championships
2016
 1st  National Time Trial Championships
 2nd National Road Race Championships
2017
 1st  National Road Race Championships
 1st  National Time Trial Championships

References

External links
 
 

1993 births
Living people
Namibian male cyclists
Sportspeople from Windhoek
Cyclists at the 2014 Commonwealth Games
Commonwealth Games competitors for Namibia
White Namibian people